The Ports of Bremen, Bremen Ports or Bremish Ports, in German "Bremische Häfen" consist of the commercial ports in Bremen and Bremerhaven. They are managed by bremenports GmbH & Co. KG, a company of private status in public property.

In 2011, in the Ports of Bremen more than 60 million tons of goods were transported, including 6 million containers and 2.1 million cars. Bremerhaven Harbour is the world's busiest port transporting cars.

History

Medieval harbours 
The first port of Bremen was the Balge, a narrow branch of the Weser river. In the mid-13th century, on Bremen city's riverside of the main river, a quay was built, called the Schlachte. For about three centuries, both ports were used in parallel, before Balge harbour stopped being used.

Outer Harbours 
Like in many other European regions, the medieval extension of agriculture increased erosion of soil in the Weser basin. Since about 1400, the bed of the lower Weser was choked with sand, dramatically. Laden sea vessels could no longer run upriver to Bremen city.
Ships were discharged on riverboats in the open lower Weser. In 1622/23, Bremen's first outer harbour was founded in Vegesack, 20 km downstream of Bremen. Soon it was lacking depth, too.

Finding a more durable outer harbour site was difficult, as the neighbouring territorial states preferred to patronize their own ports. Finally in 1827, the state of Bremen succeeded to buy the ground of the relics of Swedish foundation Carlsburg on the mouth of the Geeste river into the Weser estuary. In 1830 the first port of Bremerhaven was opened.

Emigrants 
In 1832, Bremen passed a law for human standards for emigrant passengers in overseas traffic. For some decades the ports of Bremen became the most important emigrant harbour of central Europe.

Weser Correction and modern basins 

After Bremen in 1847 was linked to the Royal Hanoverian State Railways, the Bremish state built its own short railway line from the (Hanoverian) station to the bank of the river Weser near the edge of the old city. The goods station on the new quay, called Weserbahnhof, was one of the most modern links between land transport and sea trade of that age.

In the last quarter of the 19th century, a way was found to employ the help of natural powers to use the lower Weser as an efficient waterway for modern sea vessels. Ludwig Franzius, building superintendent of Bremen, recorded the hydrology of the lower Weser for several years. In 1881, he published a convincing project. In 1887 to 1895, works were done under his management. In the meantime, in Bremen city some modern basins were built. When in 1888 the state of Bremen joined the German Customs Union, the Europahafen became a free port that was later enlarged by other new basins.

Since mid 20th century 

Over the last decades, the ports of Bremen have seen the same developments as most other ports of the world:
 Overseas passenger traffic has switched to air transport.
 Mixed cargo has been displaced by container transport.
 The increase of the size of sea vessels.

The reactions were:
 In 1964, Bremen's first container port was opened, the Neustädter Hafen.
 Since the 1970s, a line of container terminals were built north of the older ports of Bremerhaven, on the bank of the Weser estuary on the edge of the open sea.
 The Überseehafen, which opened in 1906, was taken out of service in 1991. In 1998, the basin was filled up with soil excavated in the maintaining of the shipping lane of outer Weser estuary. This reclaimed land has provided space for a new urban district, called Überseestadt.

List of basins and other sites 
– except for marinas and regional passenger traffic –

Bremen 
Hemelingen urban district comprises the basins for inland navigation:
 Fuldahafen
 Werrahafen
 Allerhafen
Überseestadt urban area, besides the former Überseehafen area, still contains some active basins:
 Europahafen
 Holz- und Fabrikenhafen ("Wood and Factories Harbour")
 Getreidehafen ("Cereal Harbour")
Häfen urban district, right bank:
 Dock harbours, protected by Oslebshausen lock: 7 basins called Industriehäfen ("Industrial Harbours") 
 open river bank beneath Stahlwerke Bremen metallurgic plant: Mittelsbürener Hafen, also called Klöcknerhafen from a former owner of the plant
Häfen urban district, left bank:
 the small Hohentorshafen
 Neustädter Hafen (named from the urban district of Neustadt – "New City") with 2 basins near the dispatching area of Güterverkehrszentrum Bremen
Blumenthal urban district:
 the sea port of Farge power station
 the petrol port of a federal petrol reserve
 the car shipping port on the quay of the former Bremer Vulkan shipyard.

Bremerhaven 

Fischereihafen urban district:
 Dock harbour of deep-sea fishery 
Exclave of Bremen city:
 Dockports: 
 Kaiserhäfen ("Emperor's Ports")
 Car shipping port
 Lloyd Werft shipyard  
 Passenger port Columbuskaje
 Open container terminals I to III
Weddewarden urban district:
 Open container terminal IV

Sources & weblinks 
 Manfred Rech, Gefundene Vergangenheit – Archäologie des Mittelalters in Bremen, Bremer Archäologische Blätter, Beiheft 3/2004, (background informations of an exhibition on archeological findings of medieval Bremen in Bremen state museum of cultural history), p. 104 ff., chap. IV.C.: Die Häfen an Balge und Schlachte ("The ports on Balge river and Schlachte quay")
 Ludwig Franzius: Die Korrektion der Unterweser (1888), with a collection of maps as supplement, available without reservation in the reading-room of Staatsarchiv Bremen
 http://www.bremenports.de/files/2/65/128/ZahlenDatenFakten.pdf PDF
 Heinrich Flügel (1914, thesis): Die deutschen Welthäfen Hamburg und Bremen. 420 pages (Reprint 2012) example of the text (PDF; 2,3 MB)
 www.bremenports.de
 WeserKontor GmbH (26. Februar 2014): Seehäfen & Seeschifffahrt → Bremische Häfen
 Senator für Wirtschaft, Arbeit und Häfen (Bremish Department for Economics & Ports, 06.03.2014): Neues Hafenkonzept setzt auf Nachhaltigkeit

Bremen